The Scottish Reserve League is the largest of the three organisations operating 2nd XV Leagues in Scotland. Originally all 2nd XV rugby union league matches were played under the auspices of the Scottish 2nd XV League, however in recent years a number of breakaways have occurred - clubs in the Scottish Borders forming their own Borders Championship, and clubs in Edinburgh and the Lothians the Edinburgh & Lothian 2nd XV League (although confusingly, some clubs have their 2nd XVs in the Scottish and their 3rd XVs in this breakaway body). A Caledonia 2nd XV League was established for 2005-2006 but abandoned without a game played, although a competition for clubs in the very north of Scotland - the Brin Cup - did go ahead. Moves are afoot to reunite the 2nd XV league system.

After a short lived "experiment" of a pod system to reduce travel, the leagues reverted to a straight pyramid system for Season 2012–13. The Caledonia District teams were all entered into the main league system to provide more regular opposition, leaving the regional reserve league with only two districts.

The league was formerly called the Inter-City 2nd XV League, then Scottish 2nd XV league prior to adopting its current title.

Promotion and relegation
The operates on the basis of two up/two down between all division, except between the various Regional Division 1 and National Division 2, where only the winner of Division 1 West is promoted, and the winner of Division 1 East. Third XVs and lower teams can not play in the same or higher league as that of teams from their clubs and can not also be promoted to the National league.

The Scottish Reserve League, National Divisions, 2012-2013

The Scottish Reserve League, Regional Divisions, 2012-2013

There are two Regions: West and East.

The Scottish Reserve League, West Region, 2012-2013

The Scottish Reserve League, East Region, 2012-2013

External links
 http://www.scottish2xv.org.uk/
 http://www.scottishrugby.org/community/content/view/1363/301/

Res